The 2022 Asian Tour was the 27th season of the modern Asian Tour, the main men's professional golf tour in Asia excluding Japan, since it was established in 1995.

The investment was backed by LIV Golf.

Schedule
The following table lists official events during the 2022 season.

Order of Merit
The Order of Merit was based on prize money won during the season, calculated in U.S. dollars.

International Series Order of Merit
The International Series Order of Merit was based on prize money won during the season, calculated in U.S. dollars. The leading player earned status to play in the 2023 LIV Golf League.

Awards

Notes

References

External links
The Asian Tour's official site

Asian Tour
Asian Tour
Tour